Bureau Brothers Foundry was a foundry established by two French immigrants, Achille and Edouard Bureau, in Philadelphia, Pennsylvania, USA, in the 1870s.  It was one of America's premier art foundries for many years, and cast works by some of the nation's leading sculptors.

In 1892, the foundry was located at the west corner of 21st Street and Allegheny Avenue in Philadelphia.
By 1913, it had moved to the southeast corner of 23rd and Westmoreland Streets in North Philadelphia.

In the late 20th century, the long-idled North Philadelphia building was used by a piano tuner to hold more than 200 pianos over two decades. In 2013, the building was taken over by Philadelphia Salvage, an architectural salvage company.

Works

Notes

External links 

 119 Bureau Brothers works catalogued by the Smithsonian Institution
 2013 photos of the North Philadelphia building

Foundries in the United States
Industrial buildings and structures in Pennsylvania
Artists from Philadelphia
Defunct companies based in Pennsylvania
1870s establishments in Pennsylvania